The Earle House is a historic house located at 4521 Bayshore Road in Sarasota, Florida.  The -story house was designed by local architect Alfred C. Clas in the Colonial Revival style, and was completed in 1924.

It was added to the National Register of Historic Places on September 2, 1993.

References

External links
 Sarasota County listings at National Register of Historic Places
 Sarasota County listings at Florida's Office of Cultural and Historical Programs

Houses on the National Register of Historic Places in Sarasota County, Florida
Houses in Sarasota, Florida
Colonial Revival architecture in Florida
Houses completed in 1924